Onychodontiformes (also known as Onychodontida and Struniiformes) is an order of prehistoric sarcopterygian fish that lived during the Devonian period. The onychodontiforms are generally regarded as early-diverging members of the coelacanth lineage.

Phylogeny
The following cladogram is adapted from Mondéjar-Fernández (2020). The study recovered Onychodontiformes as a paraphyletic group, which is shown in green:

References

External links
 Onychodontiformes at Palaeos
 Onychodontida phylogeny at Mikko's Phylogeny Archive

 
Prehistoric lobe-finned fish
Prehistoric fish orders
Devonian bony fish
Early Devonian first appearances
Famennian extinctions
Paraphyletic groups